The Ponce Municipal Band (Spanish: Banda Municipal de Ponce), also known as Centenaria Banda Municipal de Ponce, is the band of the municipality of Ponce, Puerto Rico. The band is the oldest continuously-performing band in the Caribbean and the oldest music group in Puerto Rico. It has performed its open-air concerts for over 125 years. The current director is Juan García Germaín.  It has 42 members between 25 and 83 years old. It operates within the jurisdiction of the Oficina de Desarrollo Cultural (English: Office of Cultural Development) of the autonomous municipality of Ponce. Its headquarters are located at the Centro Integrado para el Fortalecimiento de las Artes Musicales, next to Teatro La Perla.

History
 

The history of the Ponce Municipal Band dates to its predecessor, the Ponce Firefighters' Band, a band that was already operational in 1859.  It was founded in September, 1883, by Juan Morel Campos.  In 1953, the Band reorganized and was moved from an organization under the Ponce Firefighters Corps to an organization under the Ponce Municipal Government. The directors of the band after its founder have been Domingo Cruz (Cocolia), Julio Alvarado, Emilio Alvarado, Eduardo Cuevas, Tomás Clavel, and Eustaquio Pujals. The current director is Juan B. García Germaín. Band master Julio Alvarado was the director of the band at the time of its 1953 reorganization. Gregorio Ledesma was the band conductor in 1859.

In late 2010, the Ponce Municipal Government provided the Band its own location for its rehearsals. The new location is next to the legendary Teatro La Perla at a structure named Centro Integrado para el Fortalecimiento de las Artes Musicales (Integrated Center for the Development of the Musical Arts).

Concerts

The Band originally celebrated its concerts from a since-removed second floor stage at Parque de Bombas.  It then performed from Paseo Antonio Arias (formerly, Paseo Amor), and has also performed from Concha Acústica de Ponce and Paseo Tablado La Guancha. It also performed from the Dora Colón Clavell Urban Park for some time, and it is currently performing from a removable stage at front of the Ponce City Hall. Concerts are every Sunday evening. In September, 2011, the Band adopted a new venue philosophy called Retretas en la Comunidad, whereby it started to bring its stage to the various communities of Ponce.

Directors and their terms
As "Banda del Benemérito Cuerpo de Bomberos de Ponce":
 Juan Morel Campos (1883-1886)–(1893-1896)
 Eduardo Cuevas (1896? - 1900?)
 Domingo Cruz ("Cocolia") (ca.1900–1916)
 Eustaquio Pujals (ca. 1916-1924)
 Tomás Clavell (ca. 1924 - 1928)
As "Banda Municipal de Ponce":
 Julio Alvarado (1929)
 Julio Alvarado Tricoche (1953-1970)
 Emilio Alvarado (1970 - 1978?)
 Luis Osvaldo Pino Valdivieso (1978-2001)
 Jorge Figueroa (2001 - 2003?)
 Rubén Colón Tarrats (2003 - 2013)
 Juan García Germaín - (2014 - Incumbent.)

Current members
As of March 2011, the Ponce Municipal Band had 42 members as follows:
Flute
Carlos Torres, Marines Aviles, Jose Rentas
Clarinet
Ada I. Rodriguez, Ricardo Velazquez, Julio Alvarado, Ramon Galindo, Juan Garcia, Estrella Cruz, Feliz Varela, Hector Lopez de Victoria, Cynthia Rodriguez, Nilda Cruz, Guillermo Silvagnoli, Edanette Tirado
Saxophone
Leslie Pagan, Moises Ortiz, Jorge L. Torres, Jose P. Santiago, Jose R. Santiago
Bassoon
Jesus Acevedo
Trumpet
Jose M. Ruiz, Jose Quiñones, Victor Caquias, Edgardo Ruiz, Elder Arroyo, Victor Rodriguez
Horn
Hector I. Maldonado, Felipe Gonzalez, Rohel Ortiz, Orlando Zayas
Trombone
David Perez, Israel Negron, Irving Gonzalez
Euphonium
Angel Santos, Lester Perez Cancel
Tuba
Lester Perez Flores, Arnaldo Tarrio
Percussion
Dimas Rodriguez, Luis M. Valentin, Sergio Gonzalez, Jose Alvarado

References

External links
Luciano Quiñones Photo Album
Orchestra 'La Lira Ponceña'
2007 Danza Week
Banda Municipal at Travel-Ponce

Puerto Rican musical groups
Musical groups from Ponce, Puerto Rico
1883 establishments in Puerto Rico